Homer is a town in Banks County, Georgia, United States. The population was 1,141 at the 2010 census. The town is the county seat of Banks County.

History
The community was named after Homer Jackson, a pioneer citizen. Homer was founded in 1858 as seat for the newly established Banks County. Homer was incorporated as a town in 1859, and its first courthouse was built in 1863.

Geography

Homer is located at  (34.333851, -83.499844).

Education
Banks County students in kindergarten to grade twelve are in the Banks County School District, which consists of two elementary schools, a middle school and a high school. The district has 150 full-time teachers and over 2,428 students.
Banks County Elementary School
Banks County Primary School
Banks County Middle School
Banks County High School

Demographics

As of the census of 2000, there were 950 people, 366 households, and 249 families residing in the town. The racial makeup of the town was 84.32% White, 11.79% African American, 1.16% Native American, 0.84% Asian, 1.16% from other races, and 0.74% from two or more races. Hispanic or Latino people of any race were 2.00% of the population.

There were 366 households, out of which 36.3% had children under the age of 18 living with them, 54.4% were married couples living together, 10.4% had a female householder with no husband present, and 31.7% were non-families. 26.2% of all households were made up of individuals, and 12.6% had someone living alone who was 65 years of age or older.  The average household size was 2.60 and the average family size was 3.16.

In the town, the population was spread out, with 28.1% under the age of 18, 10.5% from 18 to 24, 29.1% from 25 to 44, 20.5% from 45 to 64, and 11.8% who were 65 years of age or older.  The median age was 33 years. For every 100 females, there were 95.5 males.  For every 100 females age 18 and over, there were 95.1 males.

The median income for a household in the town was $35,500, and the median income for a family was $41,667. Males had a median income of $30,147 versus $23,438 for females. The per capita income for the town was $17,353.  About 8.9% of families and 13.3% of the population were below the poverty line, including 14.3% of those under age 18 and 21.1% of those age 65 or over.

Arts and culture
Homer is among the earliest to hold the world record for an Easter egg hunt - 80,000 eggs, listed in the 1985 Guinness Book of World Records. The event in the small town of 1,100 people is an Easter Sunday tradition that has lasted 47 years. The egg hunt each year draws about 5,000 egg hunters, children and adults. Even though it no longer holds the record, Homer has long touted its annual hunt as the world's largest.

References

Towns in Banks County, Georgia
Towns in Georgia (U.S. state)
County seats in Georgia (U.S. state)